Matt Bors (born 1983) is a nationally syndicated American editorial cartoonist and editor of online comics publication The Nib. Formerly the comics journalism editor for Cartoon Movement, he was a finalist for the Pulitzer Prize in 2012 and 2020, and became the first alt-weekly cartoonist to win the Herblock Prize for Excellence in Cartooning.

Career
Originally from Canton, Ohio, Bors attended the Art Institute of Pittsburgh, where he first began drawing editorial cartoons for the student newspaper.  At 23, his work became syndicated by Universal Features, making him the youngest syndicated cartoonist in the country at that time. His work has since appeared in the Los Angeles Times, The Nation, The Village Voice, The Daily Beast, and on Daily Kos. In 2012, US Congressman John Larson used one of Bors's cartoons during a house floor on the Affordable Care Act.

His first graphic novel, War Is Boring, a collaboration with journalist David Axe, was published in 2010 by New American Library.

In September 2013, Bors began working in a full-time capacity as a cartoonist, writer and comics editor of The Nib at Medium. In July 2015 Bors left Medium. In February 2016 First Look Media announced that they had acquired The Nib and would be collaborating with Bors to relaunch the site.

Bors has lived in Portland, Oregon, since  2008, but in late July 2020 he announced that he would soon be moving to Ontario, Canada.

Comics journalism
In addition to his editorial cartoons, Bors has also worked as both editor and journalist in the field of comics journalism. In December 2010, Bors joined the newly launched Cartoon Movement, an online platform for editorial cartoons and comics journalism from around the world, as Comics Journalism Editor. In 2010, Bors travelled to Afghanistan with Ted Rall, his first trip outside of the United  States. He filed sketches and editorial cartoons while in Afghanistan which he later expanded to full-length comics published on Cartoon Movement.

In the summer of 2011 he traveled with Cartoon Movement to Haiti, to coordinate a comics project with Haitian cartoonists that would document the effects of the 2010 earthquake one year after the catastrophe. The first part of the 75-page comics project, entitled  Tents beyond Tents, was published in January 2012. In 2012 Bors released "Haiti’s Scapegoats," an  animated documentary short exploring the LGBT community in Haiti, produced in collaboration with Cartoon Movement and video journalist Caroline Dijckmeester-Bins.

In April 2021, Bors announced that he was retiring from editorial cartooning in order to focus more on his work in comics journalism.

Awards
2020 – Pulitzer Prize for Editorial Cartooning (Finalist)
2012 – Pulitzer Prize for Editorial Cartooning (Finalist)
2012 – Herblock Prize for Excellence in Editorial Cartooning
2012 – Sigma Delta Chi Award for Editorial Cartooning (Circulation of 100,000+)

References

External links
 Comics Journalism at Cartoon Movement
Billy Ireland Cartoon Library & Museum Art Database

1983 births
Living people
American editorial cartoonists
People from Canton, Ohio
Journalists from Portland, Oregon
Artists from Portland, Oregon
Art Institute of Pittsburgh alumni
Artists from Ohio
Journalists from Ohio